The krone was a short-lived, provisional currency used in parts of the then newly formed Kingdom of Serbs, Croats, and Slovenes, parts of which had previously been part of the Austro-Hungarian Empire (Austria-Hungary). It was worth  of a dinar or 25 para. The name translates into English as crown.

History
After World War I, Austria-Hungary was disintegrated into a number of states with its southeastern portion becoming the State of Slovenes, Croats and Serbs. It and Kingdom of Serbia soon after merged to form the Kingdom of Serbs, Croats and Slovenes, which was later renamed Yugoslavia. The krone replaced the Austro-Hungarian krone at par on November 12, 1918. It circulated alongside the Serbian dinar in State of Slovenes, Croats and Serbs with an exchange rate of 1 dinar = 4 kronen in the intermediate time before the adoption of the Yugoslav dinar. The exact date at which the krone ceased to circulate is unclear, with one source indicating that the krone was still in circulation at the end of 1922.

Banknotes
The 1919 First Provisional Issue of the Yugoslav krone was (very similar to the Banknotes of the Czechoslovak koruna (1919) issued on 1912 Austro-Hungarian banknotes (with a black validating oval overprint) in 10, 20, 50, 100, and 1,000 Kronen denominations. The 1919 Second Provisional Issue contained the same denominations of 1912 Austro-Hungarian notes, but instead of an oval overprint, adhesive stamps were used for validation. The stamps on 10, 20 and 50 kronen were bilingual (Serbo-Croatian and Slovene), while stamps on the 100 and 1000 krone notes could have been in any recognized language and either script (Latin or Cyrillic).

A brief 1919 dinar issue (1, and 5 dinara) was replaced by the Ministry of Finance of the KSCS with a 1919 Krone Provisional Issue ("krone on dinar" notes), which were printed as dinar and overprinted with krone at the ratio of 1 dinar = 4 kronen. Only the 2 kronen on  dinar and 4 kronen on 1 dinar had variants without the overprint. It is as yet ambiguous as to whether the overprinted version was issued before or after.

See also

Fiume krone, used in the Free State of Fiume until 1920

Notes

References

Modern obsolete currencies
Currencies of Europe
1918 establishments in Yugoslavia
Currencies of Yugoslavia